Gil M. Portes (September 13, 1945 – May 24, 2017) was a Filipino film director, film producer and screenwriter.

Early life and education
Gil Portes took up his Journalism at the University of Santo Tomas, Manila, Philippines and received a master's degree in theater from Brooklyn College, Brooklyn, New York.

Career
His drama film, Saranggola (1999), won various awards at the Metro Manila Film Festival, including Best Picture and Best Actor. It was also entered into the 21st Moscow International Film Festival.

His drama film, Small Voices (2002), is considered a masterpiece in Filipino cinema and won eleven awards and was nominated for eleven other awards including the Gawad Urian Awards.

Death
Portes died on May 24, 2017, at the age of 71.

Filmography

Director

Awards

References

External links

 
 

1945 births
2017 deaths
Brooklyn College alumni
Filipino film directors
Filipino film producers
Filipino screenwriters
University of Santo Tomas alumni